The St. Charles Air Line is a rail line in Chicago, Illinois, partially owned by the BNSF Railway, Union Pacific Railroad, and Canadian National Railway.

It is currently used by the Canadian National Railway for freight trains and by Amtrak passenger trains.  The line runs east from south of Union Station to a junction with Canadian National Railway at 16th Street interlocking (the CN line then continues towards the shore of Lake Michigan, where it turns south under McCormick Place, passing over and then paralleling the Metra Electric Line).

History
The line was chartered in 1852 as the Chicago, St. Charles and Mississippi Air Line Railroad, planned to run from Chicago west to the Mississippi River at Savanna via St. Charles. The Chicago depot would be at the northeast corner of Stewart Avenue and 16th Street. This line would compete with the Galena and Chicago Union Railroad, which thus opposed the project, and chartered the Dixon Air Line Railroad from St. Charles west to Dixon, Illinois.

Eventually the St. Charles Air Line, an unincorporated jointly owned line, was formed as a reorganization of the project. It only built from the Illinois Central Railroad (also used by the Michigan Central Railroad) on Lake Michigan, near 14th Street, west along the original alignment to Western Avenue. From there a connection was built north to the Galena and Chicago Union Railroad, finished January 1, 1856. (The west end of the jointly owned line was, and still is, the west bank of the Chicago River.) On March 30, the G&CU and Chicago, Burlington and Quincy Railroad began using it to access the Illinois Central's Central Station. The planned alignment west of Western Avenue was later used by the Chicago and Northern Pacific Railroad, and piers in the Fox River at St. Charles had influenced predecessors of the Chicago Great Western Railway to build their line through that town.

The Chicago, Burlington and Quincy Railroad also built a line into Chicago, intersecting the Air Line at Western Avenue. Eventually, the line came under equal control of the four companies that used it: the Illinois Central Railroad, Michigan Central Railroad, Chicago, Burlington and Quincy Railroad and Chicago and North Western Railway (successor to the Galena and Chicago Union Railroad).

The Air Line's track was originally on ground level with numerous street crossings.  In the late 1890s, work was begun to raise the line onto fill and replace the grade crossings with overpasses.

As originally constructed, the east end of the Air Line connected with the IC with connections that curved to the north to serve both Central Station and the yards and warehouses through downtown up to the Chicago River.  There was a shorter, steeper ramp down for passenger trains to get into Central Station while a longer, less severe incline was used by freight trains.  In 1968, a southward-facing connection was built, generally known as the South Leg because together with the original lines a wye was formed which was occasionally used to turn passenger trains around.  The South Leg enables trains using the Air Line to travel directly to and from the south.  After the coming of Amtrak in May 1971, the remaining passenger trains were gradually shifted from Central Station to Union Station and the northern connections were removed.  This coincided with the gradual elimination of yards to the north (this area is the Illinois Center office, hotel, and retail complex today).  Central Station closed in 1972 and was razed in 1974.  Now the South Leg is the only connection from the IC mainline to the Air Line.

The CB&Q has since become part of the BNSF Railway, and the C&NW is now part of the Union Pacific Railroad, each of which still owns a 1/4 share. The MCRR has sold its share to the Illinois Central Railroad, now owned by the Canadian National Railway.

Amtrak's City of New Orleans, Illini, and Saluki utilize this line with a time-consuming switchback into Union Station from its west end. The Chicago Region Environmental and Transportation Efficiency Program (CREATE) is in the preliminary design phase for the Grand Crossing Project. This project will reroute the passenger trains from St. Charles Air Line to Norfolk Southern's Chicago Line in the Greater Grand Crossing neighborhood in Chicago. The CN also uses it as a freight connection. As of October 2021, a large project was nearing completion to replace a bridge passing over the future Wells Street Extension, and rebuild retaining walls on both lines between the 16th St. interlocking and the Chicago River. However, this section of the line has been inactive since May 2020 when the adjacent St. Charles Air Line Bascule Bridge crossing the river was elevated due to work on the west side of the river.

The Canadian National Railway's employee timetable dated July 2011 states: "St. Charles Air Line is a connection between Metra 16th St.
Interlocking and BNSF Union Ave. BNSF and UP jointly own the line between Union
Ave. and a point 70 feet west of the Bascule Bridge over the South Branch of the
Chicago River. CN owns the line from that point to 16th St. ...
Both tracks are designated Non-Main Track, CN Rule 520 applies, and is also
designated East-West. The north track is Track 1, and the south track is Track 2.
... The bridge is controlled by CSX Bridge Tender."

See also
St. Charles Air Line Bridge

References

Railroad History Database
Brandi McLoughlin, Portrait & Biographical Album of Whiteside County (1885)
Green Diamond #43 November 1996,  publication of the Illinois Central Historical Society

Rail lines in Illinois
Illinois Central Railroad
Michigan Central Railroad
Chicago, Burlington and Quincy Railroad
Chicago and North Western Railway
BNSF Railway lines
Union Pacific Railroad lines
Canadian National Railway lines